The term "last-minute goal" is used in sport, primarily association football, to describe a goal scored very late in a game, usually one that affects the outcome of the game. The definition of a "last-minute goal" commonly used is one scored either in the final or penultimate minute of regulation time or extra time, or during stoppage time or injury time.

Last-minute goals are often noteworthy if it allows the scoring team to either take the lead or to equalise.

The "golden goal", briefly used to decide extra time in some tournaments, is not usually considered a last-minute goal, unless they were scored late into extra time. Penalties scored in a shootout are not considered last-minute goals.

Notable last-minute goals
This list of last-minute goals includes notable goals from higher levels of national or international football among major tournaments and qualifying matches.

Continental cup competition
Only matches in the semi-finals and final of European club competitions that changed the outcome of the tie.
 1995 UEFA Cup Winners' Cup Final – Zaragoza vs. Arsenal, 10 May 1995: In the final minute of extra time (timed at 119:16), with the match heading to penalties, a 40-yard shot from Zaragoza's Nayim cleared Arsenal goalkeeper David Seaman, winning the cup for Zaragoza.
 1999 UEFA Champions League Final (and The Treble) – Manchester United vs. Bayern Munich, 26 May 1999: United scored two last-minute goals against Bayern to clinch the trophy and the Treble. Bayern led 1–0 going into injury time, but goals from Teddy Sheringham (assisted by Ryan Giggs) and Ole Gunnar Solskjær (assisted by Teddy Sheringham) turned the game on its head and won the match for United. The goals, timed at 90'+0:36 and 90'+2:17, came so late that the trophy already had Bayern ribbons attached to it.
 2004–05 UEFA Cup semi-final – AZ vs. Sporting CP, 5 May 2005: With both legs of the semi-final having ended 2–1 to the home side, the match went to extra time. AZ went 3–1 ahead and were heading for the final until Miguel Garcia scored a headed goal at 120'+1:13 to make it 3–2 and 4–4 on aggregate, with Sporting progressing to the final on the away goals rule.
 2005–06 UEFA Cup – Middlesbrough: English club Middlesbrough reached the final phase on the strength of two last-minute goals that overturned 3–0 aggregate deficits. On 6 April, Middlesbrough began its second leg trailing 2–0 on aggregate and a vital goal from Basel made it 3–0 on aggregate. Mark Viduka scored twice and Jimmy Floyd Hasselbaink once to level the series on aggregate, but Middlesbrough still trailed by virtue of away goals. Massimo Maccarone completed the comeback, sending Middlesbrough to the semi-final. A similar situation unfolded nearly three weeks later on 27 April, when Middlesbrough headed into its second leg trailing 1–0 to Steaua București. Middlesbrough allowed two goal in 24 minutes and trailed 3–0 on aggregate. Maccarone scored in the 33rd minute. As was the case against Basel, Middlesbrough leveled on aggregate with goals from Viduka and Chris Riggott, but still trailed on away goals. Maccarone scored late, this time in the 89th minute, to hand the home fans at Riverside Stadium another memorable comeback.
 2008–09 UEFA Champions League semi-final – Chelsea vs. Barcelona, 6 May 2009: In one of the most controversial matches in recent memory, Chelsea went into the final minutes of the second leg 1–0 up and on course to reach the final. Barcelona, its own high standards, were poor on the night, failing to register one shot on target. Chelsea had six penalty appeals turned down, and Barcelona had to play almost half an hour with ten men. Then, with the clock timed at 90'+2:10, Andrés Iniesta scored for Barcelona to give them the crucial away goal that sent them to the final, and ultimately victory over holders Manchester United, reaching a Treble.
 2013 UEFA Europa League Final – Benfica vs. Chelsea, 15 May 2013: With the scoreline level at 1–1 into injury time and faced with the possibility of extra-time, Branislav Ivanović scored the winning goal of the match with a header from a Juan Mata corner kick in the 92nd minute of the game to win the Europa League for Chelsea.
 2013 UEFA Super Cup – Bayern Munich vs. Chelsea, 30 August 2013: After two goals from Franck Ribéry and Fernando Torres sent the game into extra time, Eden Hazard scored an early goal in extra-time to give Chelsea the lead. As time ticked away, the game seemed to be set as a win for Chelsea until a Dante free-kick for Bayern bounced off of a Chelsea defender and into the path of Javi Martínez, who slotted the ball past Petr Čech. This sent the game to a penalty shoot-out that Bayern won 5–4, handing them their (and Germany's) first UEFA Super Cup.
 2014 UEFA Champions League Final – Real Madrid vs. Atlético Madrid, 25 May 2014: In the first Champions League final with two clubs from the same city, a 36th-minute Diego Godín goal had given Atlético the lead. Sergio Ramos equalised for Real Madrid in the third minute of added time to send the game to extra time. Goals from Gareth Bale, Marcelo and Cristiano Ronaldo (with a 120th-minute penalty) meant Real Madrid won the game 4–1.
 2015–16 UEFA Europa League quarter-final – Liverpool vs. Borussia Dortmund, 14 April 2016: With Dortmund set to qualify for the semi-finals on away goals, Dejan Lovren scored in the added time to reverse the tie.
 2016–17 UEFA Champions League Round of 16 - Barcelona vs. PSG, 8 March 2017: PSG had won the first leg 4-0, and scoring an away goal to make it 3-1 had meant PSG would need to concede three more goals to be knocked out.  This score remained as the game entered the final few minutes, when Neymar scored a Barcelona free kick in the 88th-minute followed by a penalty as added-time began.  Still needing one more goal to avoid elimination, Barcelona pushed everyone forwards in an attack which culminated in Sergi Roberto prodding home an overhead ball into the net with the clock showing 90'+4:41.  This gave Barcelona an unlikely 6-1 victory and sent them through; the comeback became known as La Remontada.
 2018–19 UEFA Champions League semi-final – Ajax vs. Tottenham Hotspur, 8 May 2019: Ajax were leading 2–0 at half time, 3–0 on aggregate after they won the first leg 1–0. Lucas Moura brought two goals back for Tottenham in the second half just before the hour mark. In the 96th minute, Ajax were seconds away from reaching the final, until Lucas completed his hat-trick (and the comeback) to send Tottenham through on away goals, and to their first Champions League final.
 2021–22 UEFA Champions League semi-final – Real Madrid vs. Manchester City, 4 May 2022: In the first Champions League after away goals rule was abolished, Manchester City were leading 4–3 on the first leg of semi-final against Real Madrid. In the second leg, a 73rd-minute Riyad Mahrez's goal had given Manchester City the lead 1–0 in second leg and 5–3 on aggregate, but Rodrygo scored two goals just less than one minute before going into stoppage time (timed at 89:21) and within one minute after the stoppage time started (timed at 90'+0:50), making the leg 2–1 and thus equalised for Real Madrid with the scoreline level at 5–5 on aggregate to send the game to extra time. At the 4th minute of extra time, a penalty scored by Karim Benzema was enough to send Real Madrid to the final with 3–1 in the second leg and 6–5 on aggregate.

Domestic cup
Only finals of primary national domestic cups are included in this section.
 1979 FA Cup Final – Arsenal vs. Manchester United, 12 May 1979: In this match, known as "the five-minute final", Arsenal were beating United 2–0 with five minutes remaining, but United then drew level by scoring two goals in two minutes. However, their celebrations were short-lived when Alan Sunderland scored Arsenal's winning goal just a minute later.
 1993 FA Cup Final replay – Arsenal vs. Sheffield Wednesday, 20 May 1993: With the first leg of the 1993 FA Cup final between Arsenal and Sheffield Wednesday ending in a 1–1 draw, the same scoreline stood in extra time during the replay. However, the 119th minute saw Arsenal defender Andy Linighan outjump Wednesday's Mark Bright to head in the winning goal. Linighan played most of the match with a broken nose, having been deliberately struck in the face earlier in the match by Bright, and his winner made Arsenal the first English side to win the domestic cup double.
 2002 Scottish Cup Final – Celtic vs. Rangers, 4 May 2002: With Old Firm rivals Celtic and Rangers drawing 2–2 in second-half stoppage time, Neil McCann sent in a far post cross for Peter Løvenkrands to nod the ball into the ground and over Celtic goalkeeper Rab Douglas from close range to win the cup for Rangers. The goal came with less than eleven seconds left to play, barely giving Celtic enough time to take the resulting kick-off from the centre circle.
 2004 Russian Cup Final – Terek Grozny vs. Krylia Sovetov Samara, 29 May 2004: One of the biggest upsets in Russian Cup history unfolded in Moscow's Lokomotiv Stadium as one team triumphed amidst tragedy. In 2004, Terek Grozny was playing in Russia's First Division but without a home stadium, as due to war in Chechnya, Terek Grozny often played its home matches in Pyatigorsk. One of Terek Grozny's key players that season was Andrei Fedkov — his winning goal against Shinnik Yaroslavl on 5 May 2004 sent Terek Grozny to the Russian Cup final. But on 9 May 2004, Chechen President Akhmad Kadyrov was assassinated during a Victory Day parade in Grozny. The Russian Cup final was scoreless for over 90 minutes until Fedkov scored two minutes into stoppage time to give Terek Grozny its first Russian Cup triumph.
 2006 FA Cup Final – Liverpool vs. West Ham United, 13 May 2006: West Ham were leading 3–2 going into injury time, but Liverpool captain Steven Gerrard scored what proved to be the Goal of the Season with a tremendous 30-yard strike, timed at 90'+0:08. Liverpool went on to win the match on penalties.
 2009 Russian Cup Final – CSKA Moscow vs. Rubin Kazan, 31 May 2009: CSKA played most of the cup final with ten men following a red card issued to Pavel Mamayev against reigning league champions Rubin Kazan. CSKA won its fifth cup final with Evgeni Aldonin scoring two minutes into stoppage time to steal a 1–0 victory.
 2011 Danish Cup Final – Nordsjælland vs Midtjylland, 22 May 2011: The 2011 Danish Cup Final marked the first time ever that the previous season's finalists returned as the match was contested two weeks earlier than normal (since Ascension Thursday fell on 2 June and an international match date was already allocated for 2 June). Nordsjælland and Midtjylland were tied at 2–2 until Søren Christensen scored two minutes into extra time to give Nordsjælland its second-straight Danish Cup with a 3–2 victory.
 2012 Liechtenstein Cup Final – USV Eschen/Mauren vs Vaduz, 16 May 2012: USV Eschen/Mauren pulled off one of the biggest upsets in Liechtenstein Cup history by overcoming a 2–0 deficit and a man disadvantage to force extra time. Despite allowing an Igor Manojlović penalty in the 68th minute, Vaduz was on course to win the tournament cup final for a 15th straight season and 40th overall. However, Eren Dulundu scored three minutes into stoppage time to force extra time for USV Eschen/Mauren, who was also playing in the final for a fourth season running. USV Eschen/Mauren went on to win in the penalty shootout, with Dulundu and Manjolović scoring in the shootout, the latter giving USV Eschen/Mauren its first cup final victory since 1987.
 2013 FA Cup Final – Manchester City vs. Wigan Athletic, 11 May 2013: Manchester City, in second place in the Premier League, were highly favoured over Wigan, facing relegation from the League with only two games left to improve their record. The teams were tied 0–0 going into stoppage time, but Wigan midfielder Ben Watson, who had suffered a broken leg just six months earlier in a match against Liverpool, scored with a superb header in the 91st minute (time 90'+0:09) to give Wigan the FA Cup trophy in a 1–0 victory over City. This game was the first time Wigan had won the FA Cup and was one of the biggest final upsets in the tournament's history. Wigan were, in fact, relegated at the conclusion of the 2012–13 season, the first such occurrence in FA Cup history.
 2016 Scottish Cup Final – Rangers vs. Hibernian, 21 May 2016: Heading into stoppage time, the scoreline was tied at 2–2. Looking like the match would go into extra time, Hibernian won a corner. Liam Henderson delivered a cross and their captain David Gray scored to win the match for Hibs. It was their first Scottish Cup since 1902.
 2017 Scottish Cup Final – Celtic vs. Aberdeen, 27 May 2017: With 92 minutes on the clock and the game all square at 1–1, Tom Rogic picked up the ball 40 yards out and dribbled into the area before firing a low shot past Joe Lewis in the Aberdeen goal. Rogic's goal clinched the Scottish Cup for Celtic, completing both a treble and an unbeaten domestic season.

Domestic league
Only matches that affected whether a team would win the title or be relegated are included in this section.
 1988–89 Football League First Division decider – Liverpool vs. Arsenal, 26 May 1989: The final goal in the final minute of the final game of the season won Arsenal the First Division title. Arsenal had to beat championship rivals Liverpool by two clear goals or more to win the title; any other result would mean an eighteenth title for Liverpool. Arsenal, the away team, led 1–0 at 90 minutes, and in the last minute of injury-time (90'+1:22), Michael Thomas ran through the Liverpool defence and scored a dramatic goal to win the title for the Gunners. This match is often remembered for commentator Brian Moore's famous phrase "It's up for grabs now!" as Thomas ran through to score.
 1996–97 Ekstraklasa – Legia Warsaw vs. Widzew Łódź, 18 June 1997: Going into the penultimate match of the season; Widzew was one point ahead of Legia. In the 87th minute Warsaw led 2–0, when Sławomir Majak scored. Three minutes later Dariusz Gęsior equalised with a header. Just a minute later, Legia managed to score, but the referee disallowed the goal. Finally, in 90+2', Andrzej Michalczuk made it to 3–2 to Widzew. Thanks to this incredible comeback, Widzew defended the title, winning it for the fourth time in history.
 1998–99 Football League Third Division – Carlisle United vs. Plymouth Argyle, 8 May 1999: The final match of the 1998–99 Third Division season and a notable occurrence of a goalkeeper scoring an important last minute goal. With ten seconds remaining, Carlisle goalkeeper Jimmy Glass scored from a corner, keeping Carlisle in business and in The Football League. It was rated seventh in The Times "50 Most Important Goals" and 72nd in Channel 4's 100 Greatest Sporting Moments.
 1998–99 Football League Second Division play-off Final – Manchester City vs. Gillingham, 30 May 1999: Having finished third and fourth in the league respectively, Manchester City and Gillingham had qualified for the play-offs and, after winning their respective semi-finals, faced each other in the final to compete for promotion to the First Division. Neither team could find the net until late on in the second half, when Carl Asaba burst into the City penalty area in the 81st minute and punted the ball high into the net. Then in the 87th minute, Gillingham doubled their lead as Bob Taylor scored Gillingham's second. However, in the 90th minute, City's Kevin Horlock ran onto a loose ball outside the box and smashed a shot through a crowd of players to bring the score to 2–1. Then, on 90+5 minutes, the ball was fed in to Paul Dickov in the Gillingham penalty area, who, falling backwards, managed to lever a shot over the sliding challenge of Adrian Pennock, which rocketed into the top corner. No more goals were scored in extra-time, so the match went to penalties, where City won 3–1. City keeper Nicky Weaver saved two of Gillingham's penalties. Dickov and Vince Bartram, Gillingham's keeper and Dickov's best man, swapped shirts at the end of the match.
 2000–01 Bundesliga – Hamburger SV vs. Bayern Munich, 19 May 2001: The final day of the Bundesliga season saw Bayern Munich in the lead to Schalke 04 by three points. Due to their inferior goal difference, Bayern needed at least a draw at their match at Hamburg to secure the championship, while Schalke faced SpVgg Unterhaching at home and managed to win 5–3. In the 90th minute of the Bayern match, a goal by Sergej Barbarez put Hamburg 1–0 up and, believing that Schalke had won their first Bundesliga championship for over 40 years, Schalke fans ran onto the pitch to celebrate the title, despite though the match in Hamburg not being over. In the third minute of extra time, Hamburg goalkeeper Mathias Schober, who ironically was on loan from Schalke for the second half of the season, picked up an alleged back pass with his hands and referee Markus Merk awarded an indirect free-kick for Bayern about eight metres from the Hamburg goal. Bayern defender Patrik Andersson shot the ball through the wall of Hamburg defenders into the net, making Bayern league champions for the 17th time in its history. Schalke would later be dubbed "champion of hearts" due to their close loss of Bundesliga title they believed to have already won.
 2004–05 Scottish Premier League – Motherwell vs. Celtic, 25 May 2005: The final day of the Scottish Premier League season, a day which would come to be known as "Helicopter Sunday", saw Celtic and their Old Firm rivals Rangers battling it out for the league title. Both teams were winning their respective matches; Celtic were 1–0 up against Motherwell at Fir Park whilst Rangers were winning 1–0 against Hibernian at Easter Road. As things stood, Celtic would win the SPL title by just two points, but Motherwell striker Scott McDonald scored an unlikely equaliser in the 88th minute. This meant that Rangers would win the title on goal difference as long as they beat Hibernian. Then, less than two minutes later, as Celtic pushed forward to try to salvage the title, McDonald was able to score again and give Motherwell a 2–1 win. Rangers hung on to win and were crowned champions, winning the league by a single point. Ironically, McDonald signed for Celtic two years later and helped them to win the title on the final day of the 2007–08 season.
 2006–07 Scottish First Division – Ross County vs. Gretna, 28 April 2007: The final day of the Scottish First Division season saw Gretna and St Johnstone battling it out for the league title, and promotion to the Scottish Premier League. Having been 12 points clear of St Johnstone with five games to play, a four-game winless streak had seen Gretna's lead cut down to just one point. With St Johnstone having won their final match of the season, Gretna knew that they had to win otherwise St Johnstone would be promoted to the SPL. With the score at 2–2 entering stoppage time, St Johnstone would be promoted as things stood, but in an extremely dramatic finish, James Grady broke clear in the 90th minute and scored to make it 3–2 to Gretna and win them the match and their third consecutive league title (having won the Third Division in 2005 and the Second Division in 2006), and with it, promotion to the SPL at St Johnstone's expense. The result also relegated Ross County to the Second Division. Gretna's promotion victory was all the more amazing considering the fact that they had been playing Non-League football in England just six years earlier.
 2006–07 La Liga – Real Zaragoza vs. Real Madrid, 10 June 2007: Going into their penultimate matches of the season, Real Madrid and Barcelona were level on points, heading into their respective fixtures on 72 points each. By the 88th minute in both games, Madrid were second in the table, losing 2–1 against Zaragoza and Barcelona were in first, winning 2–1 against Espanyol. In a turn of events, Ruud van Nistelrooy scored the equaliser at La Romareda; seventeen seconds later, Raúl Tamudo also levelled for Espanyol at Camp Nou. This kept Madrid ahead of their El Clásico rivals on head-to-head superiority.
 2007–08 Premier League – Manchester City vs. Fulham, 26 April 2008: Going into this game, Fulham found themselves on the brink of relegation and knew anything less than a win and they would surely have no chance of staying up. At half time, they were 2–0 down and mathematically relegated thanks to results elsewhere. However, the introduction of much maligned striker Diomansy Kamara sparked an incredible fightback by the cottagers. In the 70th minute, he pulled one back before Danny Murphy converted a rebounded penalty to make it 2–2 with ten minutes remaining. Kamara then fired a 92nd-minute winner to give Fulham an incredible 3–2 win, which proved to be the catalyst for a late survival bid that saw them win their final two games and remain in the league on goal difference.
 2007–08 Persian Gulf Cup – Persepolis vs. Sepahan, 17 May 2008: Persepolis won the 2007–08 Persian Gulf Cup in the final game of the season at the Azadi Stadium after Sepehr Heidari scored a header, timed at 90+6', to give them a 2–1 result against Sepahan. Persepolis needed to win this final game of the season at home to win the title, while eventual runners-up Sepahan only needed to avoid defeat to win the league instead.
 2009–10 Israeli Premier League – Beitar Jerusalem vs. Hapoel Tel Aviv, 15 May 2010: To win the title, Hapoel had to win their final match of the season in the stadium of their great rivals, while Maccabi Haifa also had to drop points against Bnei Yehuda. Both matches were tied at 1–1 going into stoppage time, but Hapoel's Eran Zahavi scored in the 92nd minute to win the match and the title for his team.
 2011 A-League Grand Final, 13 March 2011: The game to decide the Australian champions was goalless in the first 90 minutes. In the first half of extra time, the Central Coast Mariners scored two goals to seemingly clinch the title. However, Brisbane Roar scored two goals in three minutes, including one with almost the last kick of the match, to draw level and send the game to penalties. Brisbane then went on to win 4–2 on penalties.
 2012 A-League Grand Final – Brisbane Roar vs. Perth Glory, 22 April 2012: In the A-League Grand Final Brisbane sought to become the first back-to-back champions after their dramatic victory in the previous season's final. In front of a packed out Suncorp Stadium, the first half ended goalless, however Perth received the lead in the 51' minute thanks to an Ivan Franjic own goal. Brisbane proceeded to hurl attack after attack at the Perth defense and finally in the 84' minute, Besart Berisha equalized with a stunning header thanks to an assist from Thomas Broich. The game seemed destined for extra time when, in the very last play of the game, Berisha weaved through the Perth defense before attempting a shot on goal, but taking an air swing. In controversial circumstances referee Jared Gillett awarded a penalty to the home side. Berisha calmly slotted the penalty and Brisbane were champions again.
 2011–12 Premier League – Manchester City vs. Queens Park Rangers, 13 May 2012: Manchester City and Manchester United went into the final game of the season level on points, though City had the superior goal difference by eight. With five minutes added to the total of 90 minutes, and QPR having a lead of 1–2 with ten men, most of City fans lost their hopes since Manchester United were leading against Sunderland, Manchester City won a corner on 90+2 minutes. David Silva stepped up to take the crucial corner and as he sent the ball into the middle, Edin Džeko scored a header to equalise the game. Two minutes passed without any kind of important goal attempts and right before the last extra minute in the added time, Sergio Agüero attempted a one-two with Mario Balotelli, and after getting the ball in his feet back again, Agüero got past Nedum Onuoha and drove the ball into the back of the net as City triumphed in their campaign. Dzeko's headed goal occurred at 90'+1:15 and Aguero's goal at 90'+3:20 – the latter just 13 seconds after Manchester United's match against Sunderland had concluded at the Stadium of Light.
 2011–12 La Liga – Rayo Vallecano vs. Granada, 13 May 2012: Heading into its season finale against fellow strugglers Granada, Rayo lost nine of its last ten matches and was outscored 30–12 in those matches. Its survival efforts needed help from Getafe and Atlético Madrid, who were facing Real Zaragoza and Villarreal respectively. Zaragoza led 1–0 in an ill-tempered match and would add an stoppage time goal to win at Getafe 2–0, while Villarreal allowed a late goal by Radamel Falcao in the 88th minute at home. Yet, Rayo and Granada were still scoreless as the match approached injury time. Raúl Tamudo, however, scored one minute into stoppage time to save Rayo from relegation with a 1–0 victory. With those results, Rayo, Zaragoza and Granada (despite the loss) survived at Villarreal's expense.
 2012–13 Football League One – Brentford vs. Doncaster Rovers, 27 April 2013: Brentford and Doncaster went into the final game of the League One season with both sides needing to win to secure promotion to the Football League Championship. Doncaster were in the second automatic promotion spot before the game, with Brentford in third. A draw at full-time would have been enough to see Doncaster promoted. In the 94th minute of the game, Brentford were awarded a penalty, which was taken by Marcello Trotta. The penalty was missed, hitting the crossbar, and after a goalmouth scramble, was cleared to Billy Paynter who ran down field, crossing the ball to James Coppinger who tapped the ball into an empty net in the 96th minute of the game, securing a 1–0 win as well as Doncaster's promotion to the Championship and consigning Brentford to the play-offs.
 2012–13 Football League Championship – Hull City vs. Cardiff City and Watford vs. Leeds United, 4 May 2013: Watford and Hull City were both fighting for 2nd place and automatic promotion to the 2013–14 Premier League. Hull were 2–1 up and in the 91st minute, they were awarded a penalty which could have sealed their 2nd place spot. Hull missed their penalty, and in the 93rd minute, Cardiff were awarded a penalty, which was converted by Nicky Maynard, bringing the score to 2–2. After a serious injury delayed the match, the Watford game was fifteen minutes behind the Hull game, so with the score at 1–1, Watford knew that a win would secure their promotion to the Premier League. In the 89th minute Leeds scored to make it 2–1. The scores stayed that way and promotion for Hull was assured.
 2012–13 Football League Championship – Watford vs. Leicester City, 12 May 2013: Leicester won the first match at home 1–0, and with the score 2–1 to Watford, the game was heading to extra time. But in the 90+6' minute, Leicester were given a penalty after a foul on Anthony Knockaert in the box. However, Watford goalkeeper Manuel Almunia saved Knockaert's penalty and the following rebound. Watford gained hold of the ball and started a counterattack; a cross was swung in to Leicester's penalty area, Jonathan Hogg headed the ball down and Troy Deeney thumped it in with a half-volley to seal the victory for Watford on aggregate. The goal was timed at 90'+6:52.
 2013–14 Football League Championship – Bolton Wanderers vs. Birmingham City, 3 May 2014: Heading into the final day of the 2013–14 Football League Championship, Doncaster Rovers led Birmingham by one point in the race to avoid relegation to the Football League One. Doncaster, however, had a poorer goal differential entering its match at Leicester City. Birmingham travelled to Bolton needing to earn a better result than Doncaster to avoid relegation to England's third tier of football for the first time in 20 years. The visitors trailed 2–0 with 14 minutes remaining, but Nikola Žigić scored two minutes later to put Birmingham in contention. However, Leicester had scored in the 75th minute to go up, and had the results stayed that way, Doncaster would be safe. Three minutes into stoppage time, however, Paul Caddis headed from close range to ensure Birmingham would stay in the Football League Championship for the 2014–15 season. The 1–0 loss at Leicester sent Doncaster to the third division.
 2013–14 2. Bundesliga Relegation-Promotion Play-off – Arminia Bielefeld vs Darmstadt 98, 19 May 2014: Darmstadt qualified for the second division of the Bundesliga in one of the most dramatic circumstances in history after it matched Arminia's 3–1 first leg road victory with a 3–1 road result after 90 minutes in the second leg to force extra time. Then, after Kacper Przybyłko put Arminia ahead on aggregate, Darmstadt would have stayed in the third division of the Bundesliga until Elton da Costa, having come on the 112th minute, scored two minutes into stoppage time at the end of the second half to send Darmstadt through on away goals. Its qualification to the 2. Bundesliga was all the more impressive considering the club finished 16th the prior season and was supposed to be relegated to the Regionalliga, except that one team was not granted a license, thus sparing Darmstadt relegation.
 2014 Football League Championship play-off Final – Queens Park Rangers vs Derby County, 24 May 2014: Nearly nine years after scoring the only goal to send West Ham United into the Premier League in a play-off final, Bobby Zamora scored in the 90th minute to send QPR back to the Premier League with a 90th-minute goal in a 1–0 victory over Derby.
 2013–14 Segunda Division Play-off Final – Las Palmas vs. Córdoba, 22 June 2014: Despite finishing seventh in the 2013–14 Segunda División, Córdoba qualified for the end-of-season promotion play-offs as Barcelona's reserve team finished third, but, as a reserve team, were ineligible to play in La Liga. Córdoba reached the final by defeating Real Murcia and set up a meeting with sixth-placed Las Palmas. After a scoreless first leg, Las Palmas opened the scoring early in the second half on a goal from Apoño. The lone goal would have been enough to send Las Palmas back to La Liga for the first time in 12 years. However, home supporters of Las Palmas had invaded the pitch before the match finished and the game had to be halted for ten minutes. After order was restored, Cordoba had roughly 30 seconds remaining when Ulises Dávila, on loan from Chelsea, scored the tying goal to send Córdoba to La Liga for the first time in 42 years.
 2016–17 EFL League Two – Newport County vs. Notts County, 6 May 2017: Newport County went into the match just two points above Hartlepool United, needing a win to confirm their stay in the Football League. A brace by Hartlepool United's Devante Rodney put his side 2–1 up against Doncaster Rovers, leaving Newport County in 23rd and seven minutes away from relegation as they were drawing 1–1 at the time. In the 89th minute, Newport County defender Mark O'Brien chested a cross down and volleyed it into the bottom corner from inside the penalty box, putting his team 2–1 up and sending Hartlepool United back into 23rd position. It was O'Brien's second goal in his career, his first for Newport County, and ultimately proved to be the game-winning goal for Newport County, who stayed up in League Two. Despite defeating Doncaster Rovers, Hartlepool United wound up being relegated from the Football League after 96 years. The result also proved to be unfortunate for Doncaster Rovers, as their fourth consecutive loss cost them the League Two title.
 2016–17 EFL Championship – Aston Villa vs. Brighton, 7 May 2017: Brighton were leading the Championship league table going into the final game of the season. Brighton needed to secure all 3 points against opposition Villa to secure the championship title. Brighton established a lead in the 64th minute thanks to a Glenn Murray penalty, and it all looked won for Brighton until Jack Grealish had a shot from outside of the box on 89 minutes which Brighton goalkeeper David Stockdale made a mess of and let roll under his body, making the score 1-1, meaning Brighton lost the title to title rivals Newcastle United, thanks to their 3-0 win against Barnsley on the same day. 
2021 W-League Grand Final – Sydney FC vs. Melbourne Victory FC, 11 April 2021: Sydney finished the regular season on top of the table with 28 points, while Melbourne were third with 23. The two sides ended regulation time without scoring. There were no goals in extra time until, in the 120th minutes, Kyra Cooney-Cross scored directly from a corner kick to give Melbourne their third title.
 2021–22 EFL Championship – QPR vs. Derby County and Reading v Swansea City , 18 April 2022 : With QPR winning 1-0 against Derby thanks to a Luke Amos goal in the 88th minute, Tom McIntyre scored in the 96th minute for Reading to tie their game with Swansea at 4-4. The resulting goal sealed Derby's relegation to the EFL League One.
 2021–22 EFL League One – Sheffield Wednesday vs. Sunderland, 10 May 2022: Sunderland had a 1-0 lead from the first leg, and were 1-0 down going into stoppage time, facing the possibility of extra time. But in the 93rd minute, Patrick Roberts scored the equaliser, sending Sunderland to the play-off final, which they went on to win to clinch promotion to the Championship.
2021–22 Bundesliga – Stuttgart vs. Koln, 14 May 2022: With the score tied at 1–1 going into stoppage time, and rivals Hertha BSC losing at Dortmund, Wataru Endo scored the winning goal for Stuttgart to ensure that they will remain in the Bundesliga for the 2022–23 season, and consigning Hertha to the play-off.

International
 1992 Summer Olympics final – Poland vs. Spain, 8 August 1992: With the game tied 2–2, Kiko Narváez scored the winning goal (his second of the game and fifth of the tournament) for Spain in the 90th minute as Spain won the gold medal in a 3–2 victory.
 1994 FIFA World Cup qualification UEFA Group 6 – France vs. Israel, 13 October 1993; France vs. Bulgaria, 17 November 1993: Heading into in the final two matches of World Cup qualifying, a victory against Israel at the Parc des Princes would see France qualify for the 1994 FIFA World Cup. The home side was shocked after giving up a tying goal in the 83rd minute to Eyal Berkovic. Reuven Atar then scored in the 90th minute to give Israel, who lost to France 4–0 in an earlier qualifier in Tel Aviv, a surprise 3–2 win. The victory was Israel's first in qualifying against a European opponent since 1981, as they spent the previous two qualifying campaigns in the Oceania Football Conference. A month later, in the last game of Group 6, again played at the Parc des Princes, France had another opportunity and needed only a draw to qualify, while Bulgaria had to win. The game was tied 1–1 when Emil Kostadinov scored the winning goal for Bulgaria in the last second of regular time (89:59), and Bulgaria qualified at the expense of France – Bulgaria went on to finish fourth at the 1994 World Cup.
 1994 FIFA World Cup qualification AFC Final Round – Iraq vs. Japan, 28 October 1993,: In the final day of qualifying for the 1994 World Cup, Japan had a one-point lead over four other nations still vying for two spots at USA 1994 with a win assuring the nation of a berth at the World Cup; a draw would make things complicated as Japan would need either South Korea or Saudi Arabia to not win its match. Japan led 2–1 late in the game when Jaffar Salman headed the tying goal in the 90th minute to deny Japan a spot at the World Cup with a 2–2 draw. Coupled with Saudi Arabia's dramatic 4–3 victory over Iran and South Korea's 3–0 victory over North Korea, Japan finished third behind Saudi Arabia and South Korea, the latter on goal difference. This match has often been called in Japan the Agony of Doha. 
  1998 FIFA World Cup Qualification – UEFA Group 3 – Finland vs Hungary, 11 October 1997: Finnish goalkeeper Teuvo Moilanen scored an own goal one minute into stoppage time to deny his team a play-off berth for a chance to qualify for the 1998 FIFA World Cup with a 1–1 draw in Helsinki's Olympiastadion.
  1998 FIFA World Cup Qualification – UEFA Group 9 – Germany vs Albania, 11 October 1997: With 15 minutes in regulation remaining, Germany and Albania was tied at 1–1. But in the final 15 minutes, both teams combined for five goals. It started in the 78th minute for Oliver Bierhoff, the two-goal scorer from the Euro 1996 final, and in the 90th minute, his second goal was enough to secure Germany's passage to the 1998 FIFA World Cup.
 1998 African Cup of Nations Group B – Togo vs Ghana , 12 February 1998: Togo was playing in only its third ever African Cup of Nations tournament in 1998 (previously appearing in the 1972 and 1984 editions) searching for its first win in the tournament. The first would come in Ouagadougou, Burkina Faso when Mohamed Kader (renowned for being Togo's first goalscorer at a FIFA World Cup) scored in the 90th minute to give Togo a 2–1 victory over Ghana.
 1998 FIFA World Cup quarter-final – Netherlands vs. Argentina, 4 July 1998: The quarter-final between Argentina and Netherlands looked to be heading for extra-time until Dennis Bergkamp netted a 90th-minute winner from a  pass by Frank de Boer to take the Dutch into the World Cup semi-finals for the first time in 20 years. For the Netherlands, it was the second straight knock-out game decided on a late goal – on 29 June, Edgar Davids scored two minutes into stoppage time as the Netherlands eliminated Yugoslavia with a 2–1 victory in Toulouse, France.
 UEFA Euro 2000 qualifying Group 1 – Switzerland vs Denmark, 14 October 1998: Ole Tobiasen, playing in what would be his sixth and final game for Denmark, scored his only goal for his country in the 90th minute in Zürich to hand Denmark a vital 1–1 draw against Switzerland, a result that helped Denmark reach Euro 2000 at Switzerland's expense.
 UEFA Euro 2000 qualifying Group 8 – Macedonia vs Republic of Ireland – 9 October 1999,: Heading into the final group games in Group 8, the Republic of Ireland trailed Yugoslavia by one point for an automatic place in Euro 2000. Niall Quinn put Ireland up 1–0 in the 18th minute, and with the Yugoslavia-Croatia match tied at 2–2, Ireland was on course for Euro 2000. However, in the 90th minute, Goran Stavrevski scored the tying goal and the goal sent Yugoslavia to Euro 2000. Ireland would go on to lose to Turkey by virtue of an away goal in the play-offs.
 UEFA Euro 2000 Group A – Portugal vs Romania, 17 June 2000: Having come on in the 87th minute to replace Rui Costa, Costinha scored on a header in the fourth minute of stoppage time in Arnhem, Netherlands. It was his first goal for his country and Portugal would go on to reach the quarter-finals with a 1–0 win.
 UEFA Euro 2000 Group C – Spain vs FR Yugoslavia, 21 June 2000: Trailing 3–2 in its group stage final against Yugoslavia in Bruges, Belgium, Spain was on course for another early exit at a major tournament. However, Spain pulled off a stunning miracle as the game entered stoppage time. First, Gaizka Mendieta tied the match four minutes into stoppage time to level the score at 3–3. Two minutes later, Alfonso Perez scored his second goal of the game in the sixth minute of extra time. Not only did Spain qualify for the quarter-finals with that 4–3 victory, but in doing so, Spain also clinched Group C after opening its campaign with a 1-o loss against Norway.
 UEFA Euro 2000 Final – France vs Italy, 2 July 2000: Marco Delvecchio gave Italy the lead in the 55th minute and they held on until the final minute of injury time, when Sylvain Wiltord crashed a low drive past Italian keeper Francesco Toldo to take the game into extra time. France won the game in extra-time.
 2002 FIFA World Cup qualification - UEFA Group 1 – Faroe Islands vs Slovenia, 3 September 2000: With 87 minutes elapsed in its opening World Cup qualifier, the Faroe Islands trailed 2–0 to Slovenia. However, Uni Arge scored in the 90th minute before Øssur Hansen scored on a free kick three minutes into stoppage time to secure an unlikely 2–2 draw.
 2000 AFC Asian Cup Quarter-finals – South Korea vs Iran, 23 October 2000: Kim Sang-Sik scored his first career goal for South Korea in the 90th minute against Iran as the goal tied the match and forced extra time. South Korea went on to win on a golden goal from Lee Dong-Gook as it advanced with a 2–1 victory.
 2002 FIFA World Cup qualification - UEFA Group 1 – Slovenia: Despite blowing a 2–0 lead at the Faroe Islands, Slovenia recovered in only its second ever World Cup qualifying campaign to finish unbeaten and reach the play-offs, which it won to reach the 2002 World Cup. First, on 28 March 2011, Zlatko Zahovic, the first player to score a goal for Slovenia at a major tournament, scored four minutes into stoppage time as Slovenia drew 1–1 with Yugoslavia, a match that came nearly nine months after Slovenia blew a 3–0 lead against these same opponents. Later on 1 September, Milenko Acimovic scored on a penalty in the 90th minute to hand Russia its only loss in qualifying with a 2–1 victory.
 2002 FIFA World Cup qualification UEFA Group 9 – England vs. Greece, 6 October 2001: As the match entered injury time, and Greece were winning 2–1, news came through that Germany had drawn 0–0 with Finland. Despite Germany failing to win, as things stood, England were destined for a play-off, but a draw would win them the group and take them straight to the World Cup finals. In the third minute of injury time, England were awarded a free kick just outside the penalty area. David Beckham stepped up to take it and levelled the game at 2–2 to ensure that England qualified for the World Cup as group winners.
 2002 FIFA World Cup Group E – Republic of Ireland vs Germany 5 June 2002,: With Ireland trailing 1–0 and their World Cup hopes in the balance Mark Kinsella launched a deep ball that Niall Quinn headed to Robbie Keane. Keane scored past Oliver Kahn (one of only two players to score against Germany) as Ireland gained a valuable point in Ibaraki, Japan. Ireland would go on to reach the Round of 16, where Keane would also score on a penalty against Spain to force extra time.
 UEFA Euro 2004 qualifying Group 9 – Azerbaijan vs Serbia and Montenegro, 11 June 2003: Azerbaijan won only its second ever European Championships qualifying match as it overcame from 1–0 down by scoring two late goals. It started with Gurban Gurbanov, who had scored twice in the teams' earlier qualifier to help Azerbaijan overturn a 2–0 deficit, on a penalty in the 88th minute before Farrukh Ismayilov scored one minute into stoppage time to give Azerbaijan a 2–1 victory – a result that would eventually deter Serbia and Montenegro from reaching the play-offs for Euro 2004.
 UEFA Euro 2004 qualifying Group 2 – Denmark vs Romania, 10 September 2003: Martin Laursen scored five minutes into stoppage time to give Denmark a vital draw after trailing 2–1 to Romania late in the match. Laursen scored his first goal for Denmark in a vital 2–2 draw that ultimately proved vital. Denmark as it advanced to Euro 2004 as group winners; despite having a plus-12 goal differential in its group, Romania, which played its final group game in that campaign, missed out on the play-offs as Norway had a better head-to-head record against Romania.
 2004 African Cup of Nations Group A – Rwanda vs Guinea, 28 January 2004: Rwanda was one of three nations making its debut at the 2004 African Cup of Nations and after losing its first game to hosts Tunisia, Rwanda trailed Guinea 1–0 and were on the verge of an early exit. However, Karim Kamanzi scored three minutes into stoppage time to give Rwanda a valuable point with the 1–1 draw. Rwanda missed out on a quarter-final berth despite a 1–0 victory over DR Congo – the Guinean player who scored against Rwanda, Titi Camara, scored against Tunisia in the final group stage to break a possibility of having lots drawn between Rwanda and Guinea.
 2004 African Cup of Nations Quarter-finals – Morocco vs Algeria, 8 February 2004: After Algeria broke a scoreless tie in the 84th minute, Morocco's Marouane Chamakh scored in the 90th minute to force extra time. Morocco went on to win the game 3–1 after extra time with two goals in the second half of stoppage time. Morocco would go on to reach the final of the tournament, losing to Tunisia.
 UEFA Euro 2004 Group B – France vs. England, 13 June 2004: France, the defending champions and heavy favourites, went behind in the 38th minute, courtesy of a Frank Lampard header. The goal ended France's run of 11 matches without conceding – a run lasting 1,077 minutes. Almost 30 minutes into the second half, a penalty kick was awarded to England after Mikaël Silvestre fouled Wayne Rooney inside the penalty area. Fabien Barthez subsequently saved David Beckham's spot kick, which ultimately proved decisive as France captain Zinedine Zidane scored a free kick to equalise in the 91st minute. More drama was to follow, however, as straight after resuming play, Steven Gerrard made a poor backpass which was intercepted by Thierry Henry, who charged forward before being brought down by David James inside the England penalty area. Zidane stepped up to fire home the 93rd-minute penalty to register an injury time brace and give France a memorable 2–1 victory.
 2004 AFC Asian Cup Group C – Turkmenistan vs Saudi Arabia, 18 July 2004: The Central Asian nation Turkmenistan was making its debut at the 2004 Asian Cup and faced Saudi Arabia, looking to reaching a final for the sixth straight Asian Cup. Begençmuhammet Kulyýew, who once scored five goals in a two-legged series against Afghanistan in November 2003, scored three minutes into stoppage time to give Turkmenistan its first point at an Asian Cup in a 2–2 draw.
 2004 AFC Asian Cup Group B – Jordan vs Kuwait, 23 July 2004: Jordan was making its debut in the 2004 Asian Cup and faced Kuwait in its second match of the tournament in Jinan, China. Jordan scored two goals in a two-minute span in stoppage time. The first goal in that span was the first career goal for Khaled Saad, while Anas Al-Zboun, who scored in Jordan's successful qualifying campaign against North Korea, scored his fifth career goal for Jordan. Those two goals were the only goals Jordan scored in the group stage, and it was enough to send the country into the quarter-finals at its first attempt.
 2004 AFC Asian Cup Group D – Iran vs Oman, 24 July 2004: Oman made its debut at the 2004 Asian Cup and faced Iran in its second match and was up 2–0. Iran came back to cut the deficit in half and four minutes into stoppage time, Mohammad Nosrati, a member of Iran's winning squad for the 2004 West Asian Football Federation, scored to spare Iran's blushes, as the 2–2 draw would ultimately cost Oman a berth at a quarter-final.
 2004 Asian Cup Semi-final – Japan vs Bahrain, 3 August 2004: Japan avoided a major upset against a pesky Bahrain squad and qualified for the final thanks to a 90th-minute goal from Yuji Nakazawa. His third goal of the tournament helped Japan avoid extra time by winning 4–3 against Bahrain.
 2004 Copa América Final – Brazil vs Argentina, 25 July 2004: The Argentinians got the lead at the 87th minute. During the third minute of injury time, Adriano equalized.  Brazil won the subsequent penalty shootout for a continental title.
 2006 FIFA World Cup qualification - UEFA Group 2 – Kazakhstan vs Ukraine – 8 September 2004,: Ukraine's Ruslan Rotan scored in the 90th minute to break a 1–1 draw against the hosts, playing in its first World Cup European qualifier. The 2–1 victory in Almaty would help Ukraine qualify for the 2006 FIFA World Cup.
 UEFA Women's Euro 2005 Group A – opening match – England vs Finland, 5 June 2005: In front of a record crowd of 29,092 at the City of Manchester Stadium, England blew a 2–0 lead against debutants Finland. But Karen Carney scored a minute into stoppage time as England won 3–2 for only its third ever victory at a Women's Euro, but its first victory in 21 years.
 2006 AFC Challenge Cup quarter-finals – Kyrgyzstan vs Palestine, 9 April 2006: At Dhaka's Bangabandhu Stadium in Bangladesh, Ruslan Djamshidov scored one minute into stoppage time to send Kyrgyzstan into the semi-finals with a 1–0 victory over Palestine.
 2006 FIFA World Cup Round of 16 – Australia vs Italy, 26 June 2006: In Australia's first World Cup since 1974, the Socceroos had outdone all expectations and had qualified for the Round of 16, and were drawn against Italy. With the match scoreless after 90 minutes of regular time played, it seemed as if the match would go to extra time to decide it. However, with less than a minute to go Fabio Grosso burst into Australia's penalty box and was awarded a controversial penalty, which was scored by Francesco Totti, thus eliminating Australia from the World Cup. Totti's goal against Australia remains the latest goal scored in regulation at a FIFA World Cup.
 2006 FIFA World Cup semi-final – Germany vs. Italy, 4 July 2006: The game was even at 0–0 and looked set to be heading to a penalty shootout when, in the last minute of extra-time, Fabio Grosso scored for Italy. As Germany pushed for a quick equaliser, they allowed Italy to counterattack, and Alessandro Del Piero added a second to give Italy a 2–0 win and send them through the final, and eventual World Cup glory. Italy also won their round of 16 match against Australia with a 95th-minute penalty from Francesco Totti. ; Grosso & Del Piero's goals remain the latest goals scored in any FiFA World Cup match.
  UEFA Euro 2008 qualifying Group D – San Marino vs Republic of Ireland, 7 February 2007: Stephen Ireland scored four minutes into stoppage time to spare Ireland's blushes and prevented San Marino from scalping its first point in European Championship qualifying with a 2–1 victory.
  UEFA Euro 2008 qualifying Group D – Turkey vs Norway, 28 March 2007: Turkey played its first three Euro 2008 home qualifiers in Frankfurt, Germany due to its violent conduct from a World Cup qualifier against Switzerland. Turkey made use of its three games at Commerzbank Arena by securing seven out of nine points, the last coming in a 2–2 draw against Norway in which Turkey trailed 2–0 at halftime. Hamit Altintop scored both goals for Turkey, the second coming in the 90th minute. The match would prove vital in Turkey qualifying for Euro 2008.
  UEFA Euro 2008 qualifying Group D – Greece vs Moldova, 28 March 2007: Greece played this qualifier in Heraklion due to crowd disturbances in its previous qualifier at home against Turkey. Nikos Liberopoulos, who scored Greece's first qualifying goal for Euro 2008 (which came at Moldova), broke a 1–1 draw and scored four minutes into stoppage time, to give Greece a vital 2–1 victory. For Liberopoulos, it was not the first time he scored the winning goal this late in a match – he did it nearly two years earlier in a 2006 World Cup qualifier in Kazakhstan, scoring four minutes into stoppage time to also break a 1–1 draw.
 2007 AFC Asian Cup Group A – Australia vs Oman, 8 July 2007: Australia's Tim Cahill, the first player to score a goal for Australia at a World Cup, scored Australia's first goal at an Asian Cup, two minutes into stoppage time in what was Australia's first match in an Asian Cup as it avoided a shocking upset with a 1–1 draw against Oman.
  UEFA Euro 2008 qualifying Group E – Estonia vs Andorra, 22 August 2007: Indrek Zelinski scored his 27th career goal for Estonia in the second minute of stoppage time against Andorra in a 2–1 victory in qualifying. The goal would be his last goal he scored for Estonia, which came less than four years after scoring for Estonia.
 2007 FIFA Women's World Cup Group C – Australia vs Canada, 20 September 2007: In a match that was moved up a day earlier due to Typhoon Wipha, Australia came back twice against Canada. Canada were on course to reach the quarter-finals after Christine Sinclair put Canada up 2–1 in the 85th minute. But Cheryl Salisbury, playing in her fourth World Cup, scored two minutes into stoppage time to send Australia into the quarter-finals of a World Cup for the first time ever.
  UEFA Euro 2008 qualifying Group G – Belarus vs Luxembourg, 13 October 2007: The first major qualifier for Belarus in the city of Gomel would become one of the biggest historic events that would happen to the visitors. Luxembourg's Alphonse Leweck scored five minutes into stoppage time to give Luxembourg its first European Championship qualifying victory since 1995. The 1–0 victory also snapped Luxembourg's 55 game losing streak in European Championship qualifying.
 UEFA Euro 2008 qualifying Group B – Scotland vs Italy, 17 November 2007: Christian Panucci scored one minute into stoppage time to send the World Cup holders to Euro 2008 (along with France) with a 2–1 victory against Scotland, who themselves had still been in a position to qualify had they won. It was only Panucci's third (of four) goals for Italy, and his first in over five years.
 2008 African Cup of Nations – Opening Game – Ghana vs Guinea, 20 January 2008: Ghana kicked off the tournament in the capital city Accra by securing all three points against Guinea, with Sulley Muntari scoring in the 90th minute to give Ghana a 2–1 victory. Muntari would go on to be voted as one of the 11 best players in the 2008 African Cup of Nations as Ghana finished third in the tournament.
 2008 AFC Challenge Cup Group A – India vs Afghanistan, 30 July 2008: Climax Lawrence scored only his second ever goal for India (his first coming nearly 30 months ago) as India defeated Afghanistan 1–0, a result that would ultimately help India win the 2008 Challenge Cup and the automatic berth to the 2011 Asian Cup (which would be India's first continental participation since 1984).
 UEFA Euro 2008 – Turkey: A number of vital last-minute goals defined Turkey's progression through the tournament, with the Turks leading games for only nine total minutes up to the semi-finals. Versus Switzerland in Group A, an injury time (92nd) minute goal by Arda Turan kept the Turks in the tournament. In the subsequent group decider against the Czech Republic, Turkey came back from 2–0 down to win 3–2 with a last minute (89th) winner by Nihat Kahveci. In the quarter-final match versus Croatia, Ivan Klasnić scored in the last minute of normal extra-time (119th) and looked to have booked Croatia's place in the semi-finals but again with the last kick of added time (123rd), Semih Şentürk of Turkey levelled the score at 1–1 to take the game into penalties, which Turkey won 3–1. Ironically, a last minute (90th) goal by Philipp Lahm of Germany subsequently eliminated Turkey 3–2 in the semi-final.
 2010 FIFA World Cup qualification - UEFA Group 6 – Ukraine vs Belarus, 6 September 2008: Andriy Shevchenko broke a scoreless match against Belarus by converting a penalty four minutes into stoppage time as he scored his 38th goal for his country as Ukraine began its qualifying campaign with a 1–0 victory.
 2010 FIFA World Cup qualification - UEFA Group 8 – Montenegro vs Bulgaria, 6 September 2008: Montenegro played in its first World Cup qualifying match when it led 2–1 in the 94th minute and on course for an historic victory. Blagoy Georgiev denied the hosts the victory after scoring two minutes into stoppage time as the game ended 2–2.
 2010 FIFA World Cup qualification - UEFA Group 1 – Portugal vs Denmark, 10 September 2008: In a wild finish that saw both nations score four goals after the 80th minute, Denmark's Daniel Jensen broke a 2–2 draw two minutes into stoppage time as Denmark stunned Portugal 3–2 in Lisbon. That victory would ultimately prove useful for Denmark as it qualified for the 2010 World Cup as group winners ahead of Portugal.
 2010 FIFA World Cup qualification - AFC Fifth Round – Saudi Arabia vs Bahrain, 9 September 2009: After playing to a scoreless first leg against Saudi Arabia, Bahrain was tied at 1–1 and had the away goal advantage. However, Hamad Al-Montashari put Saudi Arabia up 2–1 in the first minute of stoppage time. Then in the third minute of stoppage time, Bahrain had a corner kick which Ismail Abdul-Latif headed into the back of the net. Having scored the winning goal against South Korea in a 2007 Asian Cup group stage match, Abdul-Latif scored the tying goal to put Bahrain into a play-off against New Zealand with the 2–2 draw.
 2010 FIFA World Cup qualification CONCACAF fourth round – United States vs. Costa Rica, 14 October 2009: On the final day of CONCACAF World Cup qualifying, Costa Rica needed to win against the United States to qualify (the U.S. had already qualified) and force Honduras into the CONCACAF–CONMEBOL playoff against Uruguay. Honduras had to win and hope for a United States win or draw to qualify. Honduras won their match against El Salvador by 1–0; at the same time, the Costa Ricans were winning 2–1. However, referee Benito Archundia ordered five minutes of stoppage time because Costa Rican manager René Simoes, who had been sent off, refused to leave the pitch. The game was delayed while police were called in to escort Simoes off the pitch. At 90'+4:40, Jonathan Bornstein scored direct from a corner kick for the United States. The game ended 2–2, meaning Honduras qualified on goal difference. Costa Rica, who were 20 seconds away from qualifying, faced Uruguay in the inter-confederation play-off, which Uruguay eventually won.
 2010 African Cup of Nations Group A – Angola vs Mali, 10 January 2010: One of the most entertaining and high scoring games in the tournament's history unfolded two days after a devastating bus attack on the Togo national team. The opening match of the 2010 African Cup of Nations saw host Angola enjoy a 4–0 lead against Mali with 16 minutes remaining. What unfolded in the last 20 minutes of the match was a major comeback by Mali. It started in the 79th minute when Seydou Keita scored before Frédéric Kanouté scored in the 88th minute in what would be consolation goals. However, Keita scored three minutes into stoppage time before Mustapha Yatabaré scored a minute later to stun Angola with a 4–4 draw.
 2010 African Cup of Nations Quarter-finals – Ivory Coast vs. Algeria, 24 January 2010: With the game tied at 1–1 in regulation and the match heading for extra time, the Ivory Coast's Abdul Kader Keïta, who scored three goals for his country in the 2008 edition, had his nation on the verge of a semi-final berth with a goal in the 89th minute. But Madjid Bougherra scored two minutes into stoppage time to force extra time. Algeria, who had only scored one goal in the group stage, won 3–2 on a goal from Hameur Bouazza two minutes into extra time as Algeria went on to finish fourth in the tournament.
 2010 FIFA World Cup Group F – New Zealand vs. Slovakia, 15 June 2010: Slovakia were looking on track to win their first World Cup match, as they led New Zealand 1–0 courtesy of a Robert Vittek goal early in the second half. Three minutes into injury time, however, defender Winston Reid headed in a Simon Elliott cross to equalize the game, and earn New Zealand's first World Cup point.
 2010 FIFA World Cup Group C – United States vs. Algeria, 23 June 2010: The United States needed to win their final Group C match as England were beating Slovenia 1–0 in the other match. As things stood, England would win the group and Slovenia would go through at the United States' expense, but Landon Donovan slotted the ball home in the first minute of stoppage time to send the U.S. to the top of the group, while Slovenia were eliminated.
 UEFA Euro 2012 qualifying Group C – Estonia vs. Faroe Islands, 11 August 2010: The first qualifier for Euro 2012 was held in Tallinn's A Le Coq Arena, where Estonia overcame a 1–0 deficit by scoring twice in stoppage time, with Kaimar Saag (one minute into stoppage time) and Raio Piiroja (three minutes into stoppage time) to give Estonia a 2–1 victory. The victory would prove crucial as Estonia would reached the play-offs just over one year later.
 UEFA Euro 2012 qualifying Group A – Austria vs. Kazakhstan, 7 September 2010: Kazakhstan had held Austria for 90 minutes of football to a scoreless draw, until Roland Linz and Erwin Hoffer both scored into stoppage time to give Austria a 2–0 victory in its first Euro 2012 qualifier.
 UEFA Euro 2012 qualifying Group B – Macedonia vs. Armenia, 7 September 2010: In a wild finish, both teams headed into stoppage time with the match tied at 1–1. Edgar Manucharyan put the visitors up 2–1 in the first minute of stoppage time and were on course for a crucial victory. Macedonia, having lost its opening qualifier in Slovakia on a last-minute goal by Filip Hološko three days earlier in Bratislava, earned a penalty in the sixth minute of stoppage time, converted by Ilčo Naumoski to secure a 2–2 draw.
 UEFA Euro 2012 qualifying Group H – Denmark vs. Iceland, 7 September 2010: Thomas Kahlenberg scored one minute into stoppage time to give Denmark a 1–0 victory in its first Euro 2012 qualifying match.
 UEFA Euro 2012 qualifying Group I – Scotland vs. Liechtenstein, 7 September 2010: Stephen McManus scored his first goal for Scotland in nearly three years as his goal came in the seventh minute of stoppage time to spare Scotland's blushes and hand them a 2–1 victory over Liechtenstein.
 UEFA Euro 2012 qualifying Group E – Finland vs Hungary, 12 October 2010: Balázs Dzsudzsák scored four minutes into stoppage time as Hungary defeated Finland 2–1 after the hosts tied the match with four minutes remaining in regulation.
 UEFA Euro 2012 qualifying Group F – Georgia and Greece, 26 March 2011: Both Greece and Georgia each won games with last-minute goals that had Group F in a three-way fight with Croatia. In fact, Georgia pulled to within one point of Croatia after Levan Kobiashvili scored in the 90th minute to give Georgia a shocking 1–0 upset of Croatia. Meanwhile, Greece's Vasilis Torosidis, who scored the game-winning goal in a 2010 World Cup match against Nigeria, scored the only goal of the match four minutes into stoppage time in Ta' Qali, Malta, as Greece leapfrogged both Croatia and Georgia with the 1–0 victory.
 2012 African Cup of Nations qualification – Senegal, Tanzania, South Africa and Kenya, 26 March 2011: Four African nations won home games with the winning goals coming late in regulation. In Dakar, Demba Ba scored two minutes into stoppage time to break a scoreless tie and give Senegal a crucial 1–0 victory against Cameroon. In Dar es Salaam, Tanzania, the home side, trailed early against the Central African Republic two minutes into the match before coming back to tie the match in the 70th minute. Then Mbwana Ally Samatta scored in the 90th minute to give Tanzania a 2–1 victory and its first African Cup of Nations victory in qualifying since 2008. South Africa's match against Egypt at Johannesburg's Ellis Park was also scoreless for 90 minutes when Katlego Mphela, famous for his thunderous free kick against Spain at the 2009 FIFA Confederations Cup, scored three minutes into stoppage time to give South Africa its first victory against Egypt in a competitive fixture. Finally, in Nairobi, Kenya got its qualifying campaign back on track against Angola after it trailed 1–0 and tied the match at 1–1. McDonald Mariga scored one minute into stoppage time to give Kenya a 2–1 victory.
 2011 FIFA Women's World Cup group stage – New Zealand vs. Mexico, 5 July 2011: Mathematically eliminated from contention, New Zealand trailed Mexico 2–0 as they were facing another loss in their World Cup history. The game went into stoppage time as Rebecca Smith scored to cut the deficit to 2–1. Then, four minutes into stoppage time, New Zealand secured an unlikely draw when Hannah Wilkinson scored– as New Zealand scored its first point at a FIFA Women's World Cup in Sinsheim, Germany.
 2011 FIFA U-17 World Cup semi-final – Mexico vs. Germany, 7 July 2011: Mexico and Germany were tied with only one minute left before injury time. Julio Gómez scored the winning goal for Mexico from a corner with a bicycle kick that hit the bottom-right post and went in. With the goal, Mexico went on to beat Germany in the semi-finals and clinched the title after beat Uruguay in the final.
 2011 FIFA Women's World Cup quarter-final – United States vs. Brazil, 10 July 2011: Brazil were winning 2–1, but in the second minute of injury time, Abby Wambach scored to tie the game at 2–2. The U.S. won the following penalty shootout. Wambach's goal not only saved the U.S. from elimination, but also prevented their worst-ever finish at the Women's World Cup. The feat was all the more impressive considering that the U.S. had played half of the match with ten players following the controversial sending off of Rachel Buehler. Ironically, the U.S. were defeated in the final by Japan in almost identical fashion, when Homare Sawa scored with three minutes remaining to tie the game at 2–2, then to win the game in a penalty shootout, securing its first-ever Women's World Cup title.
 UEFA Euro 2012 qualifying Group G – Montenegro vs. England, 7 October 2011: Andrija Delibašić scored on 90'+0:15 to equalise 2–2 against England and clinch a play-off spot for Montenegro in only their second major tournament and first European Championship qualification round as an independent nation.
 2012 African Cup of Nations qualifying Group K – Chad vs. Malawi, 8 October 2011: Tunisia and Malawi were battling to grab an automatic berth to the 2012 African Cup of Nations on the final day of qualifying, with Malawi having missed a major opportunity against Tunisia one month earlier. Malawi would be denied the chance to go to the 2012 African Cup of Nations when Chad's Karl Max Barthelemy scored four minutes into stoppage time as Chad drew Malawi 2–2.
 2012 African Cup of Nations qualifying Group B – Nigeria vs. Guinea, 8 October 2011: Nigeria was on course to reach the African Cup of Nations after Ikechukwu Uche put Nigeria ahead 2–1 in the 84th minute. But the game featured 12 minutes of stoppage time, with Ibrahima Traoré scoring deep into stoppage time. The 2–2 draw sent Guinea to the 2012 African Cup of Nations and Nigeria became another big African nation that missed out on the tournament.
 UEFA Women's Euro 2013 qualification Group 6 – Croatia vs. Slovenia, 27 October 2011: Croatia overcame a 3–1 deficit by scoring two goals in stoppage time. Petra Glavač and Izabela Lojna scored two minutes and five minutes into stoppage time, respectively, as Croatia secured a 3–3 draw. That result proved to be the only point Croatia gained in qualifying for Women's Euro 2013.
 2012 African Cup of Nations Group A – Equatorial Guinea vs. Senegal, 25 January 2012: Newcomers and co-hosts of the 2012 African Cup of Nations, Equatorial Guinea was playing only its second ever match at a major tournament when it was the first nation to qualify for the tournament's quarter-finals. It did so despite giving up a tying goal in the 89th-minute goal to Senegal's Moussa Sow. Three minutes into stoppage time, Kily scored the winning goal as Equatorial Guinea's 2–1 victory also meant Senegal was the first nation eliminated from the 2012 African Cup of Nations.
 2012 African Cup of Nations Group C – Tunisia and Gabon, 27 January 2012: Two African nations qualified for the quarter-finals as they did so after only two games in Libreville, Gabon. Tunisia's match against debutantes Niger was 1–1 throughout most of the match. Niger was on its way for an historic first point after scoring its first goal at a major tournament, but Issam Jemâa, who led in qualifying with six goals, scored in the 90th minute to give Tunisia a 2–1 victory. In the next match, Gabon joined fellow co-host Equatorial Guinea into the quarter-finals. Gabon trailed 1–0 when Pierre-Emerick Aubameyang and Daniel Cousin scored four minutes apart as Gabon was on course for the victory. Having scored in the 24th minute to open the scoring, Houssine Kharja tied the match one minute into stoppage time, but Bruno Mbanangoyé Zita scored eight minutes into stoppage time (virtually the last kick of the game) as Gabon won 3–2.
 2012 Summer Olympics – United States vs. Canada, 6 August 2012: Alex Morgan headed past Erin McLeod in the 123rd minute of play with the score leveled at 3–3 with a hat-trick from Christine Sinclair for Canada. The goal sent the U.S. to the gold medal match to face the reigning World Cup champions Japan.
 2013 African Cup of Nations qualification Second Round – Burkina Faso vs. Central African Republic, 14 October 2012: Burkina Faso qualified for the 2013 African Cup of Nations after the nation was level with Central African Republic (who had eliminated Egypt earlier) on aggregate, but trailed by virtue of away goals. Alain Traoré, having scored in the 18th minute in the second leg, scored six minutes into stoppage time to send Burkina Faso to the African Cup of Nations with the 3–2 aggregate victory. Traoré would go on to add another late goal in the 2013 African Cup of Nations – his first goal of the tournament came in the fourth minute of stoppage time against Nigeria in Nelspruit, South Africa, as Burkina Faso earned a 1–1 draw, a result that would help the nation reach the final (which they lost to Nigeria 1–0).
  2014 FIFA World Cup qualification - AFC Fourth Round – Uzbekistan vs. Iran, 3 June 2012: Iran began its final phase of World Cup qualifying by securing three vital points in Tashkent, Uzbekistan, after Mohammad Reza Khalatbari scored three minutes into extra time to give Iran a 1–0 victory. That victory would prove crucial as Iran qualified for the 2014 FIFA World Cup, whilst Uzbekistan had to go through a fifth-place play-off.
  2014 FIFA World Cup qualification – UEFA Group C – Germany vs. Sweden, 16 October 2012: Sweden made one of the most dramatic comebacks in World Cup qualifying history when it trailed 4–0 with 35 minutes remaining. After 76 minutes, Sweden was able to cut the deficit to 4–3. Three minutes into stoppage time, Rasmus Elm scored on the final play of the game as Sweden secured an unlikely point in Berlin. The 4–4 draw would eventually help Sweden reach the UEFA play-offs and it would be the only game Germany failed to win during qualifying for the 2014 World Cup.
 UEFA Women's Euro 2013 play-off round – Spain vs. Scotland, 24 October 2012: Spain and Scotland met to determine who would qualify for the tournament in Sweden and both teams went into extra time after each match finished 1–1 in regulation. With the second leg held in Madrid, Scotland went ahead on aggregate in the 98th minute on a goal from Kim Little, before Silvia Meseguer tied the match. Spain was heading out of the tournament until Veronica Boquete scored in the 122nd minute to give Spain the 4–3 aggregate victory. The victory also helped Spain qualify for just its second ever Women's European Championship, with their only other appearance coming in 1997.
  2014 FIFA World Cup qualification – UEFA Group F – Northern Ireland vs. Azerbaijan, 14 November 2012: Once famous for his record-breaking Euro 2008 qualifying campaign, David Healy scored his first goal for Northern Ireland in four years in the sixth minute of stoppage time against Azerbaijan to give Northern Ireland a 1–1 draw.
  2014 FIFA World Cup qualification – UEFA Group D – Hungary vs. Romania, 22 March 2013: In a match in Budapest that was played behind closed doors, Romania secured a vital point as Alexandru Chipciu scored in the second minute of stoppage time. The 2–2 draw would ultimately prove crucial for Romania, as it would advance to the play-offs at Hungary's expense.
  2014 FIFA World Cup qualification – UEFA Group F – Israel vs. Portugal, 22 March 2013: Fábio Coentrão helped Portugal come from 3–1 down in a World Cup qualifier and scored the tying goal three minutes into stoppage time. The 3–3 draw would prove crucial as Portugal advanced to the play-offs at Israel's expenses and eventually qualify for the 2014 World Cup.
  2014 FIFA World Cup qualification - AFC Fourth Round – South Korea: South Korea qualified for its eighth-straight World Cup on the strength of two vital results that featured last minute goals. First, on 26 March 2013, South Korea needed a goal six minutes into injury time to break a 1–1 draw against Qatar as Son Heung-min scored only his second goal for the country (his first coming in the 2011 Asian Cup) and South Korea won 2–1. Then, on 4 June 2013, South Korea was on the verge of losing in Lebanon for a second time in the qualifying campaign. Kim Chi-woo, however, scored six minutes into stoppage time to give South Korea hope with the 1–1 draw.
  2014 FIFA World Cup qualification - AFC Fourth Round – Japan vs. Australia, 4 June 2013: Needing a point to secure qualification for the 2014 World Cup, Japan trailed Australia 1–0 on an 81st-minute goal from Tommy Oar. But Japan would be awarded a penalty and in the first minute of stoppage time, Keisuke Honda scored on a penalty as the 1–1 draw sent Japan to the 2014 World Cup. It was Japan's fifth-straight trip to the World Cup, but the first time that the nation qualified for the tournament on home soil.
 2013 CONCACAF Gold Cup Group A – Canada vs. Martinique, 7 July 2013: The opening match of the 2013 Gold Cup, played in Pasadena's Rose Bowl, saw a major upset as Martinique defeated Canada on a goal from Fabrice Reuperné three minutes into stoppage time. Reuperné's only other goal for Martinique came in Kingston, Jamaica, during a 2003 CONCACAF Gold Cup qualifier against Saint Lucia and it exacted revenge from 2002, as he missed his attempt when the teams went to a penalty shootout when the teams met in the tournament's quarter-final 11 years earlier. Martinique's 1–0 victory was only the nation's second-ever victory at a CONCACAF Gold Cup, with the only other victory coming on 21 January 2002.
 2013 CONCACAF Gold Cup Group A – Cuba vs. Belize, 16 July 2013: The penultimate group stage match of the 2013 Gold Cup, held at Rentschler Field in East Hartford, Connecticut, saw Cuba facing tournament newcomers Belize. Both teams lost their first two group stage matches, but both teams still had a chance at a quarter-final berth. To do so, both teams would have to overturn its goal differential to overtake Martinique; Cuba needed to win by four goals and led 3–0 after Ariel Martínez completed his hat trick in the 84th minute. Three minutes into stoppage time, Yénier Márquez scored the fourth goal that Cuba needed to overtake Martinique for the last quarter-final spot of the tournament. The 4–0 victory was also Cuba's first tournament victory since 13 July 2003.
  2014 FIFA World Cup qualification – UEFA Group E – Switzerland vs. Iceland, 6 September 2013: Jóhann Berg Guðmundsson capped off one of Iceland's best games in World Cup qualifying history by scoring a hat trick in Bern. His third goal of the game came one minute into stoppage time as Iceland overturned a 4–1 deficit to secure a vital point with a 4–4 draw.
  2014 FIFA World Cup Group E – Switzerland vs. Ecuador, 15 June 2014: in the third minute of stoppage time, Haris Seferovic scored the winning goal with just 20 seconds remaining in the game. This is also the latest winning goal in the group stage at a World Cup.
  2014 FIFA World Cup Group G – United States vs. Portugal, 23 June 2014: After Portugal was leading the match for the first-half with a goal from Nani, the U.S. took the lead with two goals in the second-half. In the 94th minute, however, 20 seconds before the end of the match, Silvestre Varela scored the tying goal for Portugal, ending the match on a 2–2 draw and saving Portugal from elimination.
 2014 FIFA World Cup Round of 16 – Netherlands vs. Mexico, 29 June 2014: With Mexico leading 1–0, Wesley Sneijder scored in the 88th minute for the Dutch to make it 1–1. In the 92nd minute, Arjen Robben was fouled in the penalty box by Mexican captain Rafael Márquez. Dutch substitute Klaas-Jan Huntelaar converted the winning penalty to send the Netherlands through to the quarter-finals with a 2–1 victory.
 2015 FIFA Women's World Cup Semi-finals – Japan vs. England, 1 July 2015: In the second semi-final match, reigning champions Japan faced England, who reached the semi-finals for the first time. Both teams scored one goal each in the first half of the match from penalties. The score was still 1–1 until the second minute of stoppage time, when Laura Bassett committed an own goal while attempting to clear the ball off the English goaline. Japan moved on to lose their title to U.S., their former opponent in the final round four years ago in Germany, after a 2–5 defeat. England, however, went on to beat Germany 1–0 to secure third place.
2022 FIFA World Cup qualification - 2022 FIFA World Cup qualification – UEFA Group A - Portugal vs. Serbia, 14 November 2021:Portugal needed at least a draw to automatically qualify for the 2022 FIFA World Cup and Serbia needed a win to automatically qualify.Portugal were tied with Serbia at 1-1 which meant that Portugal would go through to the world cup.But a 90th minute header by Aleksandar Mitrović would send Serbia to the world cup meaning that Portugal had to go through the playoffs to qualify,which they eventually did.
2022 FIFA World Cup qualification – UEFA Second Round – Italy vs. North Macedonia, 24 March 2022: Italy had controlled the match, creating multiple chances but struggling to convert them. With the game seemingly going to extra time, in the 90+2 minute(90’+1:45), Aleksandar Trajkovski scored from outside the box, which eliminated Italy from the 2022 FIFA World Cup despite having won the 2020 UEFA Euro months earlier.

See also
 Buzzer beater (basketball)
 Kicks after the siren in Australian rules football
 List of Hail Mary passes in American football

References

Scoring (association football)
Association football terminology